"Volverás" ("You'll Come Back") is a song written by Manny Delgado and performed by Venezuelan band Los Terrícolas from on their studio album Te Amaré (1974). In the song, the singer is certain that his lover will come back from regret. It was later covered by Puerto Rican salsa singer Víctor Manuelle on his third self-titled studio album. Manuelle's version became his second #1 song on the Billboard Tropical Airplay chart.

See also
List of Billboard Tropical Airplay number ones of 1996

References

1973 singles
1996 singles
Los Terricolas songs
Víctor Manuelle songs
1970s ballads
Sony Discos singles
Spanish-language songs
Song recordings produced by Sergio George